Matthieu Jost may refer to:
 Matthieu Jost (figure skater)
 Matthieu Jost (entrepreneur)